Badiouré is a settlement the Bignona Department of the Ziguinchor Region in Senegal. The population was 3518 as of 2002.

References

External links
PEPAM

Populated places in the Bignona Department
Arrondissement of Tenghory